Vesa Hellman (born  in Pertteli) is a Finnish wheelchair curler.

He participated in the 2014 Winter Paralympics where Finnish team finished on tenth place.

Teams

References

External links 

Profile at the official website for the 2014 Winter Paralympics

Living people
1970 births
People from Salo, Finland
Finnish male curlers
Finnish wheelchair curlers
Paralympic wheelchair curlers of Finland
Wheelchair curlers at the 2014 Winter Paralympics
Finnish wheelchair curling champions
Sportspeople from Southwest Finland
21st-century Finnish people